Count Karl Bonaventura Finck von Finckenstein (Jäskendorf 13 May 1794 - Jäskendorf 19 January 1865 was a Prussian Chamberlain, Member of the Prussian House of Lords ("Preußisches Herrenhaus") and Master of Schönberg

References

1794 births
1865 deaths
Members of the Prussian House of Lords